Ryakhovo is a rural locality (a selo) in Sergeikhinskoye Rural Settlement, Kameshkovsky District, Vladimir Oblast, Russia. The population was 35 as of 2010.

Geography 
Ryakhovo is located 18 km northwest of Kameshkovo (the district's administrative centre) by road. Saulovo is the nearest rural locality.

References 

Rural localities in Kameshkovsky District